Acleris razowskii is a species of moth of the family Tortricidae. It is found in Japan (Honshu).

The wingspan is 15–16 mm.

References

Moths described in 1975
razowskii
Moths of Japan